This is a list of notable Americo-Liberian people.

The Americo-Liberian or Congau ethnic group has produced several notable politicians, businessman, and professionals including:

Politicians and Administrators 
Wilmot Collins, Liberian-born American politician serving as the mayor of Helena, Montana
Nathaniel Barnes, Liberian businessman and politician
Charles Cecil Dennis, Liberian diplomat and politician
C. Cyvette M. Gibson, Mayor of Paynesville, Liberia
Louis Arthur Grimes, Liberian jurist
Richard Abrom Henries, Liberian politician
Elijah Johnson, Liberian pioneer and founding father of Liberia
James A. A. Pierre, Liberian politician
Charles Taylor, Liberian President and convicted war criminal
Hilary Teague, Liberian pioneer and author of the Liberian Declaration of Independence
Frank E. Tolbert, Liberian politician and businessman
E. Reginald Townsend, Liberian politician and journalist
Winston Tubman, Liberian lawyer and politician
Clarence Lorenzo Simpson Sr., Liberian politician and former Vice President
Kimmie Weeks, Liberian human rights activist

Educators and Writers 
Edward Wilmot Blyden, Liberian intellectual scholar and Pan-Africanist pioneer
Mary Antoinette Brown-Sherman, Liberian educator and first African woman to serve as president of a university
Anna E. Cooper, educator, dean of the University of Liberia
Helene Cooper, journalist for The New York Times
John Payne Jackson, influential journalist in the Lagos Colony and founder of the Lagos Weekly Record
Wayétu Moore, author

Entrepreneurs and Businesspersons 
Romeo A. Horton, a founder of the Africa Development Bank
Clarence Lorenzo Simpson Jr., Liberian judge and businessman
Benoni Urey, Liberian businessman and the wealthiest Liberian
Rhoda Weeks-Brown, General counsel to the IMF

Scientists and Medical professionals 
Solomon Carter Fuller, Liberian pioneer and African-American psychiatrist and physician

American-born presidents of Liberia 
Americo-Liberians formed a cultural elite in Liberia. The following presidents of Liberia were born in the United States:
Joseph Jenkins Roberts, first and seventh president. Born in Norfolk, Virginia
Stephen Allen Benson, second president. Born in Cambridge, Dorchester County, Maryland
Daniel Bashiel Warner, third president. Born in Baltimore County, Maryland
James Spriggs-Payne, fourth and eighth president. Born in Richmond, Virginia
Edward James Roye, fifth president. Born in Newark, Licking County, Ohio.
James Skivring Smith, sixth president. Born in Charleston, South Carolina, Charleston County, South Carolina
Anthony W. Gardiner, ninth president. Born in Southampton County, Virginia
Alfred F. Russell, tenth president. Born in Lexington, Fayette County, Kentucky
William D. Coleman, thirteenth president. Born in Fayette County, Kentucky
Garretson W. Gibson, fourteenth president. Born in Baltimore, Maryland

Also one Americo-Liberian president of Liberia was born in the British West Indies:
Arthur Barclay, the fifteenth president of Liberia, was born in Bridgetown, Barbados

All subsequent presidents were born in Liberia.

References 

Creole peoples
Americo-Liberian people
Americo-Liberian people